George Johnstone (15 December 1914 –11 September 1974) was a Scottish footballer who played as a goalkeeper. He played for Aberdeen, Dunfermline Athletic, Raith Rovers, Greenock Morton and Cowdenbeath. Johnstone appeared for Aberdeen in two Scottish Cup Finals (1937 and 1947) and a Scottish League Cup Final (1947).

References

External links 

1914 births
1974 deaths
Footballers from North Lanarkshire
Association football goalkeepers
Scottish footballers
Aberdeen F.C. players
Celtic F.C. wartime guest players
St Mirren F.C. wartime guest players
Hamilton Academical F.C. wartime guest players
Dunfermline Athletic F.C. players
Raith Rovers F.C. players
Greenock Morton F.C. players
Scottish Football League players
Scottish Junior Football Association players
Benburb F.C. players
Thornton Hibs F.C. players
Newburgh F.C. players
Cowdenbeath F.C. players
Date of death missing
Place of death missing